Crella is a genus of marine demosponges in the family Crellidae.

Subgenera 
 Crella (Crella) Gray, 1867
 Crella (Grayella) Carter, 1869
 Crella (Pytheas) Topsent, 1890
 Crella (Yvesia) Topsent, 1890

Species 
 Crella acanthosclera (Lévi & Lévi, 1983)
 Crella aceratospiculum (Carter, 1880)
 Crella affinis (Brøndsted, 1924)
 Crella akraleitae (Brøndsted, 1932)
 Crella alba (Vacelet, 1969)
 Crella albula (Bowerbank, 1866)
 Crella atra (Topsent, 1890)
 Crella aurantiaca Bertolino, Calcinai & Pansini, 2009
 Crella basispinosa Burton, 1931
 Crella beglingerae van Soest, 2009
 Crella brasiliensis Moraes, 2011
 Crella caespes (Ehlers, 1870)
 Crella carnosa (Topsent, 1904)
 Crella carteri Van Soest & Hooper, 2020
 Crella chelifera van Soest, 1984
 Crella commensalis Whitelegge, 1906
 Crella compressa (Carter, 1886)
 Crella crassa (Hentschel, 1914)
 Crella cyathophora Carter, 1869
 Crella digitifera (Lévi, 1959)
 Crella dispar (Topsent, 1927)
 Crella donsi Burton, 1931
 Crella elegans (Schmidt, 1862)
 Crella erecta (Lévi, 1963)
 Crella fallax (Topsent, 1890)
 Crella fristedti (Dendy, 1924)
 Crella fusifera Sarà, 1969
 Crella gelida (Lundbeck, 1910)
 Crella gerzensteini (Swartschevsky, 1906)
 Crella gracilis (Alander, 1942)
 Crella guernei (Topsent, 1890)
 Crella hanseni (Topsent, 1890)
 Crella hennequinae Goodwin, Berman & Hendry, 2019
 Crella incrustans (Carter, 1885)
 Crella jaegerskioeldi Alander, 1937
 Crella linguifera (Topsent, 1890)
 Crella mammillata (Arnesen, 1903)
 Crella mollior Topsent, 1925
 Crella nodulosa Sarà, 1959
 Crella novaezealandiae (Bergquist & Fromont, 1988)
 Crella papillata (Lévi, 1958)
 Crella papillosa (Schmidt, 1870)
 Crella pertusa (Topsent, 1890)
 Crella plana Picton & Goodwin, 2007
 Crella polymastia (Thiele, 1903)
 Crella pulvinar (Schmidt, 1868)
 Crella pyrula (Carter, 1876)
 Crella richardi (Topsent, 1890)
 Crella ridleyi (Topsent, 1890)
 Crella rosea (Topsent, 1892)
 Crella rubiginosa (Schmidt, 1862)
 Crella schottlaenderi (Arndt, 1913)
 Crella shimonii Pulitzer-Finali, 1993
 Crella sigmata Topsent, 1925
 Crella spinulata (Hentschel, 1911)
 Crella stylifera Hentschel, 1914
 Crella topsenti (Babiç, 1922)
 Crella triplex (Koltun, 1970)
 Crella tubifex (Hentschel, 1914)
 Crella ula (de Laubenfels, 1950)

References

External links 
 
 

Poecilosclerida
Sponge genera